Prionapteryx ochrifasciata is a moth in the family Crambidae. It is found in Kenya.

References

Endemic moths of Kenya
Ancylolomiini
Moths described in 1919